Taormina is a surname. Notable people with the surname include:
Anne Taormina, Belgian mathematical physicist
Giovanni Taormina (born 1988), Italian footballer
Matt Taormina (born 1986), American ice hockey player
Sheila Taormina (born 1969), American athlete 
Carlo Taormina (born 1940), Italian lawyer, politician, jurist and academic